The Class B (under 60 feet) was one of three motorboating classes contested on the Water motorsports at the 1908 Summer Olympics programme. Nations could enter up to 3 boats. In addition to the 60 foot limit, boats were limited to "a total piston area not exceeding that represented by four cylinders each of 155 mm. bore."

The B class was held on 28 August, after the abortive first running of the open class. Again only two boats appeared at the starting line, Quicksilver and Gyrinus. Quicksilver became threatened by water coming in over the sides, abandoning the race. Gyrinus, a small boat with an extra crewman to bail water, was able to finish to make its crew the first Olympic champions in motorsports.

Results

References

See also
 
 
 

Class B